Mike Waufle (born June 27, 1954) is a former American football coach who most recently served as the defensive line coach for the Buffalo Bills of the National Football League (NFL).  Waufle served as defensive line coach for the Oakland Raiders from 1998 to 2003 and coached in Super Bowl XXXVII after the 2002 season. Waufle coached primarily single gap 4 man defensive lines in 4-3 Defenses.  He was the defensive line coach for the New York Giants from 2004 to 2009, and the defensive lines he coached were a strength of the team.  He won Super Bowl XLII in 2007; in that game the defensive line's performance is generally credited with being a decisive factor. The defensive line of the Giants during the Superbowl sacked Tom Brady 5 times, leaving little time for Patriots receivers to get downfield before defensive linemen reached Brady. Holding the Patriots historically high scoring offense to 14 points the Giants defeated the previous undefeated New England Patriots. He returned to the Raiders in 2010 and 2011. From 2012 to 2016, he was the defensive line coach for the St. Louis / Los Angeles Rams under head coach Jeff Fisher.  He coached the Buffalo Bills defensive line in 2017. Buffalo returned to the playoffs after 17 years. Waufle retired after the 2017 season.

Early years
Waufle served in the United States Marines from 1972 to 1975. He played defensive end for Bakersfield College in 1975 and 1976. Bakersfield College won the 1976 Junior Rose Bowl and was named Junior College National Champions. He transferred to Utah State, where he played for defensive line coach Rod Marinelli. Utah State won the PCAA Conference Championship in 1978.

In 2009 he was awarded the Marine Corps “Lifetime Achievement Award” by Commandant General James T. Conway.

References

1954 births
Living people
American football defensive linemen
Alfred Saxons football coaches
California Golden Bears football coaches
Fresno State Bulldogs football coaches
New York Giants coaches
Oakland Raiders coaches
Oregon State Beavers football coaches
UCLA Bruins football coaches
Utah State Aggies football coaches
Utah State Aggies football players
United States Marines
People from Hornell, New York
Players of American football from New York (state)
St. Louis Rams coaches
Bakersfield College alumni
Buffalo Bills coaches